is a passenger railway station located in the city of Asago, Hyōgo Prefecture, Japan, operated by West Japan Railway Company (JR West).

Lines

Station layout
The station consists of two opposed ground-level side platforms connected to the station building by a footbridge. The station is staffed.

Platforms

Adjacent stations

History
Ikuno Station opened on April 17, 1895. With the privatization of the Japan National Railways (JNR) on April 1, 1987, the station came under the aegis of the West Japan Railway Company.

Passenger statistics
In fiscal 2016, the station was used by an average of 273 passengers daily

Surrounding area
Ginzan Town Corridor
Ikuno Silver Mine

See also
List of railway stations in Japan

References

External links

 Station Official Site

Railway stations in Hyōgo Prefecture
Railway stations in Japan opened in 1895
Asago, Hyōgo